Norodom Kantol (15 September 19201976) was a member of the Cambodian royal family and Prime Minister of Cambodia, serving from 1962 to 1966. He also served as foreign minister under the Sangkum government led by his cousin, Norodom Sihanouk. During the Khmer Republic regime of Lon Nol, he was imprisoned along with other members of the royal family.

Disappearance
Kantol disappeared mysteriously in 1976, presumably killed by the Khmer Rouge. Kantol was a leading adviser of Norodom Sihanouk. At the end of his tenure, he had been the longest continuously serving prime minister, and the first to have served more than 2 years.

Honour

Foreign honour
 :
 Honorary Recipient of the Most Exalted Order of the Crown of the Realm (1964)

See also
List of people who disappeared

References

|-
 

1920 births
1970s missing person cases
1976 deaths
20th-century Cambodian politicians 
Cambodian Buddhists
Executed Cambodian people
Executed royalty
Foreign ministers of Cambodia 
Government ministers of Cambodia
House of Norodom
Male murder victims
Missing person cases in Cambodia
Nancy-Université alumni 
Prime Ministers of Cambodia
People executed by the Khmer Rouge
People who died in the Cambodian genocide
Sangkum politicians